Andoque or Andoke may refer to:
 Andoque people, an ethnic group of Colombia
 Andoque language, a language of Colombia

See also 
 Andoquero language, a language of Colombia
 Andaqui (disambiguation) (a people and a language of Colombia)
 Andokides (disambiguation) (several persons of Ancient Greece)